Rebecca Bossavy (born 7 August 1995) is a handball player from France who competes for Issy-Paris Hand. Her team reached semifinals of the 2015/16 Cup Winners' Cup.

References

1995 births
Living people
French female handball players